Insurgents fighting against the Centralist Republic of Mexico sought to establish the Republic of the Rio Grande as an independent nation in northern Mexico. The Republic of the Rio Grande was one of a series of independence movements in Mexico against the unitary government dominated by Antonio López de Santa Anna, including the Republic of Texas, and the Second Republic of Yucatán. The rebellion lasted from 17 January to 6 November 1840.

Background 
After a decade of strife, Mexico won its independence from the Kingdom of Spain in 1821.  After a failed attempt at a monarchy, Mexico adopted a new constitution, the 1824 Constitution. This new constitution established los Estados Unidos Mexicanos, or "the United Mexican States," as a federal republic. During the war for independence, many rebels were driven to Coahuila and Nuevo León, where this revolutionary mentality won the hearts and minds of the people.

In 1833, General Santa Anna was elected to his first term as president and was, at the time of his election, in support of the federal republic. However, after some members of government angered Santa Anna's political allies, Santa Anna decided to start a centralized government. Santa Anna suspended the constitution, disbanded Congress and made himself the center of power in Mexico. States were converted into departments without political or fiscal autonomy by replacing elected governors with appointed ones and substituting for state assemblies with juntas under Santa Anna's policies. Dismayed by these policies and the perception that the government was deaf to the complaints and plight of the villagers in the North, Republic leaders aimed to expel the government-appointed centralist officials and restore the Constitution of 1824. On November 3, 1838,  one of the republic leaders, Antonio Canales Rosillo, issued a pronunciamiento against the government and in favor of federalism.

Resistance 
In January 1839, Antonio Canales summoned a convention at the office of the Justice of the Peace in Laredo where the Constitution of 1824 was unanimously approved. Canales immediately began building an army and scoured the countryside looking for recruits, among those recruits were Texan Colonels Reuben Ross and Samuel Jordan. Intending to use the property of the church and convents to pay volunteers, In 1839 and 1840 Canales was able to freely travel both sides of the Rio Grande, and recruited a small army of both Tejano and Mexican vaqueros and Caddo Indians, as well as receiving the assistance of the Texian Auxiliary Corps.

On 3 October Canales and his army marched to the town of Mier, where they faced the Mexican army. During the battle, Colonels Reuben Ross and Samuel Jordan charged at the centralist forces and encircled them in a hacienda, where the Mexican army was forced to surrender. Three hundred and fifty centralist soldiers who were taken prisoner ultimately defected and enlisted in Canales’ army. After the battle, Canales was seen as a hero throughout Northern Mexico and many towns began to support his cause. Within a few days, recruits, supplies, and cash were being sent to him.

Canales lingered in Mier for forty days before heading to Matamoros, a port town where another Centrist force was residing. In twenty-eight days, his one thousand man army reached the town only to find Mexican General Valentín Canalizo there with fifteen-hundred troops. Outmanned, Canales decided to withdraw and attack General Mariano Arista at Monterrey instead. Colonel Ross, appalled by this withdrawal, left Canales’ army, taking fifty Texans with him. At Monterrey, General Canales sent three hundred cavalry under the command of Colonel José Antonio Zapata to lure Arista out of town. While Arista left the town unguarded to engage with Zapata, General Canales’ army took a convent on the outskirts of town. However, on December 27, General Arista sent spies to Canales’ army and bribed seven hundred Mexicans to abandon their army. Upon discovering this the next morning, Canales and the remnants of his army fled the battle.

Rebellion

A New Republic

On the 17 January 1840 a meeting was held at the Oreveña Ranch near Laredo. A group of notables from the states of Coahuila, Nuevo León, and Tamaulipas advocated for a rebellion seeking secession from Mexico and formation of their own federal republic with Laredo as the capital. However, those states' own congresses and governments never took any action to support the insurgents, and requested the help of the Central government in Mexico City to aid the local state armies. Despite the lack of support from the state governments, the Republic of the Rio Grande was formed. The new Republic had an official newspaper: “Correo del Rio Bravo del Norte” and their state motto was Dios, Libertad y Convención (God, Liberty, and Convention).

The insurgents designated their own officials for the new republic.  They were:
 Jesús de Cárdenas, A former lawyer and political chief of the Northern Department of Tamaulipas. He was sworn in as president of the new Republic.
 Antonio Canales, The commander-in-chief of the new republic and one of the founding fathers of the republic.
 Juan Nepomuceno Molano, A council representative for Tamaulipas.
 Francisco Vidaurri y Villaseñor, A council representative for Coahuila.
 Manuel María de Llano, A council representative for Nuevo León.
 Juan Francisco Farías, Secretary of State
 José María Jesús Carbajal, Secretary of State (after Farías)

Battle of Santa Rita de Morelos (24-25 March 1840)

Shortly after the formation of the Republic of the Rio Grande, word arrived that General Arista was in the Rio Grande valley. Texan Samuel Jordan urged Canales to retreat to Texas to recruit more Texans but Canales refused. Consequently, Samuel Jordan and 60 of his men left General Canales’ army. While Canales and the army decided to fight, President Cardenas and the new government fled to Victoria, Texas.

Canales and his army met Arista outside the town of Santa Rita de Morelos. Needing provisions, Antonio Zapata and 30 men rode into town where Arista's men soon surrounded them. Outnumbered by 1,800 men, Zapata surrendered. General Arista offered to pardon Antonio Zapata under the condition that he swore allegiance to Mexico, but he refused. On 29 March 1840, Antonio Zapata was executed and his head placed on a spike in the town of Guerrero as a reminder to his wife, children, and federalists. While Zapata was being held prisoner, General Canales engaged Arista at San Fernando, losing 250 of his four hundred men in the process. After this defeat, Antonio Canales had no other option except to flee to Texas.

Texas's role in the Rebellion
From the beginning, President Cardenas realized that the success of the Republic of the Rio Grande depended on Texan support. Texas also had conflicting interests on whether to support the new Republic or not. On one hand, the formation of the Republic of the Rio Grande would create a buffer state between Mexico and Texas, postponing any possible intentions Mexico had for the reinvasion of Texas; on the other hand, Texas needed Mexico to recognize its independence and supporting the new Republic would certainly anger them. Texas's official stance on the issue was neutral, but president Mirabeau Lamar secretly encouraged Texans to volunteer in Canales's army and gave Canales access to Texan arms and ammunition.

Battle of Saltillo (25 October 1840)
In Texas, Canales rebuilt his new army at San Patricio under Colonel Samuel Jordan. The new army consisted of 300 Mexicans, 80 Cane Indians, and 410 Texans. With the new army, Canales marched out of Texas and was able to recapture the towns of Laredo, Guerrero, Mier, and Camargo.

Soon after, Canales ordered 350 men, under the command of Samuel Jordan and Canales’ brother-in-law Juan Molano, to steal horses for future operations. After Jordan and Molano sacked the city of Ciudad Victoria and installed a new state government, they marched to Saltillo where the Mexican General Montoya was residing. Unbeknown to Jordan, Juan Molano had secretly switched sides and joined the centralist forces.

On 25 October 1840, the Mexican army under Montoya faced the army of the Republic of the Rio Grande under the command of Colonel Lopez (who had secretly switched allegiance to General Montoya as well). Colonel Lopez ordered Jordan and his men to move into a mountain gorge. Upon realizing the trap, Jordan, his men, and the remaining loyal vaqueros to the Rio Grande Republic turned around and took refuge in a hacienda. The Mexican army attacked the hacienda in full force but was unable to capture the Texans before they retreated. The Mexican army lost four hundred men attacking the hacienda while the Texans only lost five.

Defeat 
After the defeat at Saltillo, General Canales secretly entered negotiations with General Arista and on November 6, 1840, Antonio Canales surrendered at Camargo. Canales soon accepted a position as an officer in Santa Anna's army. As part of conditions of surrender, no harm would come to the property or safety of former members of the republic. The Republic's debts would be assumed as well. A few days after Canales's surrender, President Cardenas and other officials entered Laredo to officially surrender.

Flag of the republic 

The flag of the Republic of the Rio Grande has a blue hoist with three white stars run evenly along the hoist. The three stars represent the three states that seceded: Coahuila, Nuevo León, and Tamaulipas. The fly is split into three horizontal bands of white, red, and black.

Legacy
Remnants of the republic's effect can be seen in:
 Zapata County, Texas, as well as the city of Zapata are named in honor of Republic of the Rio Grande cavalry commander, Colonel José Antonio de Zapata.
 Republic of the Rio Grande Capitol Building Museum is located in Laredo, Texas.
 As an addition to the historical six flags over Texas, the Laredo Morning Times newspaper adds a seventh flag to its banner: the flag for the Republic of the Rio Grande.

See also
 Juan Bautista Alvarado, leader of the California Revolt
 Filibuster (military)
 List of historical unrecognized states
 Revolt of 1837 (New Mexico)

References

General
 
 
 
Coppock, Mike. 2005. “The Republic of the Rio Grande.” Wild West 18, no. 4: 46–52. History Reference Center, EBSCOhost (accessed November 1, 2016).
 De la Garza, Beatriz. From the Republic of the Rio Grande: A Personal History of the Place and the People. Austin, US: University of Texas Press, 2013. Accessed November 1, 2016. ProQuest ebrary. pp. 1–22.
 The Laredo Morning Times Online edition
 Lindheim, Milton. “Republic of the Rio Grande.” Waco, TX: W.M. Morrison, Publishing Co. Texas AMU. Accessed November 1, 2016.
 “Mexico – Filibustering:  Republic of the Rio Grande,” Flags of the World.
“Northern Mexico—New Republic of the Rio Grande.” American Masonic Register and Literary Companion (1839-1847) 1, no. 43 (jun 27 1840): 338.
 
 “The Republic of the Rio Grande:  A Story of Its Rise and Fall,” Sons of DeWitt Colony Texas.
Valerio-Jiménez, Omar S. River of Hope: Forging Identity and Nation in the Rio Grande Borderlands. Durham, NC: Duke University Press, 2013.
Vigness, David M. “Relations of the Republic of Texas and the Republic of the Rio Grande.” The Southwestern Historical Quarterly 57, no. 3 (1954): 312–21.
 Yahoo! News article mentioning Republic of the Rio Grande in a present-day context

Further reading

 

 
1840 disestablishments in North America
1840 in Mexico
Rio Grande
History of Laredo, Texas
Mexican Texas
History of Nuevo León
Independent Mexico
States and territories established in 1840
States and territories disestablished in 1840
Former territorial entities in North America
Separatism in Mexico
1840 establishments in North America